Robert William Goodlatte (born September 22, 1952) is an American politician, attorney, and lobbyist who served in the United States House of Representatives representing  for 13 terms. A Republican, he was also the Chair of the House Judiciary Committee, which has jurisdiction over legislation affecting the federal courts, administrative agencies, and federal law enforcement entities. Goodlatte's district covered Roanoke and also included Lynchburg, Harrisonburg, and Staunton.

In 2017, Goodlatte presided over a GOP effort, conducted in a secret session, to weaken the independent Office of Congressional Ethics, a move widely criticized by House leaders and the opposition party. The proposal passed by a 119 to 74 vote, but it was withdrawn the following day after widespread public criticism. On November 9, 2017, Goodlatte announced that he would not seek reelection in 2018. In February 2020, Goodlatte registered as a lobbyist representing the Project for Privacy & Surveillance Accountability, a nonprofit.

Early life and education
Goodlatte was born in Holyoke, Massachusetts, the son of Doris B. (née Mentzendorff) and Robert Swan Goodlatte. His paternal ancestry includes English and Irish and his maternal grandfather was a Baltic German from Riga. Goodlatte grew up in Springfield, Massachusetts. Goodlatte received a B.A. in political science from Bates College in Lewiston, Maine in 1974. He also holds a Juris Doctor from Washington and Lee University School of Law in Lexington, Virginia, received in 1977.

Political and legal career
In his early professional career he served as a staff aide for 6th District U.S. Congressman M. Caldwell Butler from 1977 to 1979. Goodlatte went on to work as a lawyer in private practice from 1980 to 1993.

U.S House of Representatives 

Bob Goodlatte received the Republican nomination at the Republican District convention after Democratic Party candidate Jim Olin opted not to run for reelection in 1992. In the 1992 November general election, Goodlatte defeated Democratic candidate Stephen Musselwhite, who had defeated Olin's preferred choice at the district Democratic convention, with 60% of the vote. Goodlatte has been reelected ten times, often running unopposed. His most substantive Democratic opposition was in 1996, when he faced Jeff Grey, and again in 1998, when Roanoke mayor David Bowers challenged him. In an overwhelmingly conservative district, Goodlatte turned back these challenges, with 67% and 69% of the vote, respectively. In 2008, he was challenged by Democratic candidate Sam Rasoul of Roanoke. Goodlatte garnered 62% of the vote.  In 2010, Goodlatte was challenged by Independent Jeffrey Vanke and Libertarian Stuart Bain. Goodlatte won with 76.26% of the vote.

In 2009, Goodlatte was appointed to serve as the co-lead impeachment manager (prosecutor) alongside Adam Schiff for the impeachment trial of Judge Samuel B. Kent. The following year, Schiff was appointed and served as a House co-lead impeachment manager in the impeachment trial of Thomas Porteous, again alongside Schiff.

2012 election 

In 2011, Republican Karen Kwiatkowski of Mount Jackson, Virginia, announced that she would challenge Goodlatte in the Republican primary set for June 12, 2012. This was Bob Goodlatte's first contested Republican primary. Kwiatkowski earned 34% of the Republican primary vote, with Goodlatte winning 66%. He faced Democratic nominee Andy Schmookler in the general election and defeated him with 66% of the vote.

Policy views

The American Conservative Union gave him a 94% evaluation.

Office of Congressional Ethics
During a secret meeting on the night before the start of the 115th Congress, Goodlatte led an attempt by House Republicans to reduce the reach of the independent Office of Congressional Ethics. The Office was created in 2008 after numerous infractions involving Republican lobbyist Jack Abramoff, resulting in the imprisonment of House member Bob Ney. The proposed amendment to House Rules, spearheaded by Goodlatte, gave the House Ethics Committee - made up of partisan elected officials - oversight of what would be the renamed Office and power to stop inquiries that had the potential to lead to criminal charges. It would have also blocked the Office's staff from speaking with reporters and other news media members.

The amendment passed during the secret meeting, but its fortunes were reversed once news of the measure leaked out. The proposed changes immediately drew strong criticism from prominent figures on both sides of the aisle, including House Minority Leader Nancy Pelosi, President-elect Donald Trump, and even Abramoff himself. Additionally, social media catalyzed a swift reaction from constituents, with Google reporting that searches for "Who is my representative" surged in the hours following the public unveiling of the mooted changes to the Office. Representatives received thousands of calls demanding they cease their support for the amendment. In less than 24 hours, Goodlatte and his fellow Republicans scrapped the proposal.

Budget
One of Goodlatte's legislative initiatives was his constitutional amendment to require a balanced federal budget. Goodlatte wrote and put forward both the "clean" Balanced Budget Amendment which had a higher chance of actually passing the House and the Senate as well as a version that makes it harder to increase taxes by requiring a two-thirds majority vote in both chambers to raise taxes. However, Representatives Paul Ryan, Justin Amash, David Dreier and Louie Gohmert voted against the "clean" amendment because it could have allowed taxes to be raised on Americans. Ryan released a statement after the vote, saying: "I'm concerned that this version will lead to a much bigger government fueled by more taxes. Spending is the problem, yet this version of the Balanced Budget Amendment makes it more likely taxes will be raised, government will grow, and economic freedom will be diminished. Without a limit on government spending, I cannot support this Amendment."

National security

Goodlatte supported President Donald Trump's 2017 executive order to impose a temporary ban on entry to the U.S. to citizens of seven Muslim-majority countries. He stated that "The primary duty of the federal government is to keep Americans safe. Today, President Trump has begun to fulfill this responsibility by taking a number of critical steps within his authority to strengthen national security and the integrity of our nation's immigration system."

Technology
Goodlatte is the co-chairman of the bipartisan Congressional Internet Caucus, Chairman of the House Republican High-Technology Working Group, and Co-Chairman of the Congressional International Anti-Piracy Caucus.

In 1997 he sponsored the No Electronic Theft Act which criminalized several kinds of non-commercial copyright infringement, in response to the decision for the court case United States v. LaMacchia (1994).

Goodlatte is a staunch advocate of a federal prohibition of online gambling. In 2006, he sponsored H.R. 4777, the Internet Gambling Prohibition Act.  In September 2006, working with then Iowa Congressman Jim Leach, Goodlatte was a major House supporter of the Unlawful Internet gambling Enforcement Act of 2006. The Act was passed at midnight the day Congress adjourned before the 2006 elections. Prior to it being added to the bill, the gambling provisions had not been debated by any Congressional committee. The bill was made sure to exclude online gambling. They claimed moral reasons for pushing for a ban on Internet gambling, but critics charge that it was due to campaign contributions from Microsoft and Steam.

Russia probe 
Goodlatte invoked surveillance abuse against Martin Luther King Jr. in the context of alleged surveillance abuses against Trump 2016 campaign advisor Carter Page.

Savanna's Act 
His last act as Chairman of the Judiciary Committee before leaving in December 2018 was to block Savanna's Act, a bill introduced by Heidi Heitkamp and which had passed without opposition in the Senate. The bill, previously known as S.1942, was nicknamed after Fargo, North Dakota resident Savanna LaFontaine-Greywind was brutally murdered in August 2017 as an example of the horrific statistics regarding abuse and homicide of Native American women.

Committee assignments

 Committee on the Judiciary (Chairman)
 Subcommittee on Intellectual Property, Competition, and the Internet (Chairman)
 Subcommittee on Crime, Terrorism, and Homeland Security
 Committee on Agriculture (Vice Chairman)
 Subcommittee on Conservation, Energy, and Forestry
 Subcommittee on Livestock, Dairy, and Poultry
House Judiciary Task Force on Judicial Impeachment (Ranking Member)

Caucus memberships

 Congressional Internet Caucus (Co-Chair)
 Congressional Civil Justice Caucus (Co-Chair)
 Congressional Pro Life Caucus
 Congressional Prayer Caucus
 Congressional Caucus on Adoption
 Congressional Fire Services Caucus
 Congressional International Anti-Piracy Caucus
United States Congressional International Conservation Caucus
 Submarine Caucus
 Navy and Marine Corps Caucus
 National Guard and Reserve Components Caucus
 Iraq Fallen Heroes Caucus
 Shipbuilding Caucus
 Air Force Caucus
 Congressional Cement Caucus
 Republican Study Committee
 House Baltic Caucus
Congressional Constitution Caucus
Friends of Wales Caucus

Electoral history

*Write-in and minor candidate notes:  In 1992, write-ins received 160 votes.  In 1994, write-ins received 189 votes.  In 1996, write-ins received 71 votes.  In 1998, write-ins received 66 votes.  In 2006, write-ins received 948 votes. In 2008, write-ins received 262 votes. In 2010, write-ins relieved 2,709 votes. **In 1992, Bob Goodlatte received the Republican nomination at the Republican District Convention. Prior to 2012, Goodlatte had never faced a primary challenge throughout his 20-years in Congress.

Personal life
Goodlatte has been married since 1974; he and his wife have two children.

References

External links 
 
 
 
 Point/Counterpoint: Meet your congressional candidates: 6th district, Roanoke Times, September 23, 2012

|-

|-

|-

1952 births
20th-century American lawyers
20th-century American politicians
21st-century American politicians
American Christian Scientists
American people of English descent
American people of Irish descent
American people of Baltic German descent
Bates College alumni
Living people
Politicians from Holyoke, Massachusetts
Politicians from Roanoke, Virginia
Republican Party members of the United States House of Representatives from Virginia
Virginia lawyers
Washington and Lee University School of Law alumni
United States congressional aides